Ralph Milton Brown (September 16, 1908 – April 9, 1966) was a member of the California State Assembly representing the 30th State Assembly district from 1943 to 1961. Born in Somerset, Kentucky and a resident of Modesto, California, he was Speaker of the Assembly from January 1959 until he resigned in September 1961 to accept appointment to the California Courts of Appeal, Fifth Appellate District Court. He is best known for writing the Brown Act, California's first sunshine law, providing for increased public access to government meetings, which was enacted in 1953.

References

 

1908 births
1966 deaths
People from Kentucky
Speakers of the California State Assembly
Democratic Party members of the California State Assembly
People from Modesto, California
Place of death missing
20th-century American politicians